Seventh Wave is the seventh studio album by the electronic band System 7. It was released in 2001 through the A-Wave company.

Track listing

External links 
 Seventh Wave • discography on the official System 7 website
 Seventh Wave on Discogs

2001 albums
System 7 (band) albums